Mimaropa (usually capitalized in official government documents), formally known as the Southwestern Tagalog Region, is an administrative region in the Philippines. It was also formerly but still colloquially designated as Region IV-B until 2016. It is one of two regions in the country having no land border with another region (the other being Eastern Visayas). The name is an acronym combination of its constituent provinces: Mindoro (divided into Occidental Mindoro and Oriental Mindoro), Marinduque, Romblon and Palawan.

The region was part of the now-defunct Southern Tagalog region until May 17, 2002. On May 23, 2005, Palawan and the highly urbanized city of Puerto Princesa were moved to the region of Western Visayas by Executive Order No. 429. However, on August 19, 2005, then-President Arroyo issued Administrative Order No. 129 to put in abeyance Executive Order No. 429 pending a review. On July 17, 2016, Republic Act No. 10879 formally established the Southwestern Tagalog Region to be known as Mimaropa discontinuing the "Region IV-B" designation, however no boundary changes were involved.

Calapan is Mimaropa's regional center. However, most regional government offices such as the Department of Public Works and Highways and the Department of Budget and Management are in Quezon City, Metro Manila.

History 
Mimaropa, together with Calabarzon, were officially created with the partitioning of Southern Tagalog (Region IV) into the two regions on May 17, 2002, with the issuance of Executive Order No. 103 by then-President Gloria Macapagal Arroyo; for the purpose of promoting efficiency in the government, accelerating social and economic development and improving public services in the provinces covered. Region IV-B was designated as Mimaropa, which stands for the island provinces belonging to the Southern Tagalog region—Mindoro (Oriental and Occidental), Marinduque, Romblon and Palawan. Region IV-A was designated as Calabarzon.

On May 23, 2005, Executive Order 429 was issued, moving the province of Palawan to the region of Western Visayas, designating Region IV-B as "Mimaro". However, Palawan residents criticized the move, citing a lack of consultation, with most residents in Puerto Princesa and nearly all municipalities preferring to stay with Region IV-B. Consequently, Administrative Order No. 129 was issued on August 19, 2005, to address this backlash. This order directed the abeyance of Executive Order 429 pending the approval of an implementation plan for the orderly transfer of Palawan from Mimaropa to Region VI.

The 2010 Philippine Census of Population reported the region's name as "Mimaropa" and included Palawan as part of the region. , it is not clear whether the transfer of Palawan to Western Visayas is still considered pending by the Philippine government. , the National Statistical Coordinating Board of the Philippines continued to list Palawan province as part of the Mimaropa region.

On July 17, 2016, Republic Act No. 10879 formally established the Southwestern Tagalog Region to be known as the Mimaropa Region. This involved no boundary changes but was in effect merely a renaming and discontinuation of the "Region IV-B" designation.

Demographics

Languages 

The native languages of Mimaropa are:
 Alangan, spoken in the interior of Mindoro.
 Asi, spoken in Romblon and Marinduque.
 Buhid, spoken in the interior of Mindoro.
 Calamian Tagbanwa, spoken in Palawan.
 Cuyonon, spoken in Palawan.
 Hanunoo, spoken in the interior of Mindoro.
 Hiligaynon, spoken in Palawan.
 Iraya, spoken in the interior of Mindoro.
 Malay, spoken in south Palawan.
Molbog, spoken in south Palawan.
 Onhan, spoken in Romblon.
 Palawano, spoken in Palawan.
 Romblomanon, spoken in Romblon.
 Sibuyanon, spoken in Romblon.
 Tadyawan, spoken in the interior of Mindoro.
 Tagalog, spoken in Occidental Mindoro, Oriental Mindoro, Marinduque, Romblon, and Palawan. It is the regional lingua franca, mostly as Filipino.
 Tausug, spoken in southwestern Palawan.
 Tawbuid, spoken in the interior of Mindoro.

Economy 

In 2007, Mimaropa's economy surged by 9.4%, making it the fastest growing region in the country in that year. It was aided by robust growth in the industrial sector which grew by 19.1% from -6.1% in 2006. Mimaropa experienced a big slowdown in 2006, posting a decelerated growth of 2.3% from a 6.4% increase in 2005. This resulted mainly from the slump in the industry sector, which shrunk by 5.4% in 2006 from its 10.8% increase in 2005.

The agriculture, forestry, and fishing sector, which contributed 42.1% to the total regional economy, grew by 9.1% in 2006, accelerating from 3.2% the previous year. The higher production of rice, maize, other crops, livestock and fishery resulted in the accelerated growth in the total agriculture and fishery sector.

The industry sector, which contributed 38.3% to the region's total economy, was the second largest contributor next to agriculture. Its decline of 5.4% was largely attributed to the decrease in the mining and quarrying sub-sector, which went down by 15.4% due to the reduced production of natural gas in Palawan. Mining and quarrying contributed 16.6% to the total regional economy. The positive growth in the electricity and water, construction and manufacturing sub-sectors were not able to compensate to the drop in the mining and quarrying sub-sector.

The service sector, on the other hand, posted an accelerated growth of 5.1%, which was attributed to the increase in the TCS, finance, private services, government services and trade sub-sectors, which managed to post accelerated growths of 6.0%, 5.5%, 5.1%, 5.1% and 4.7%, respectively. The other sub-sector, however, had a decelerated growth due to the slowdown in the ownership of dwelling.

Tourism 
There are many scenic spots in Mimaropa. Some of them are the Bathala Cave, Balanacan Bay, and Tres Reyes Islands in the province of Marinduque; White Island in Mindoro; Fort San Andres, Mount Guiting-Guiting, and Bonbon Beach in Romblon; and the Puerto Princesa Subterranean River National Park and El Nido Marine Reserve Park in Palawan.

Administrative divisions

Provinces 

Mimaropa comprises 5 provinces, 1 highly urbanized city (Puerto Princesa), 1 component city (Calapan), 71 municipalities and 1,458 barangays.

Governors and vice governors

References

External links 
 
 
 

 
Regions of the Philippines
Luzon